George Clifford may refer to:

George Clifford (MP) (by 1524–69 or later), MP for Appleby (UK Parliament constituency)
 George Clifford, 3rd Earl of Cumberland (1558–1605), English peer and naval commander
 George Clifford (cricketer) (1852–1941), English cricketer
 George Clifford (footballer) (1896–?), English footballer
 George Clifford III (1685–1760), Dutch banker and amateur botanist
 George Clifford Sziklai (1909–1998), Hungary-born American electronics engineer
 George Clifford Wilson (1902–1957), English cricketer